Mikko Niemelä (born 9 October 1990) is a Finnish ice hockey defenceman. He is currently playing with Brynäs IF in the Swedish Hockey League (SHL) while on loan from Oulun Kärpät in the Finnish Liiga.

Niemelä made his SM-liiga debut playing with Oulun Kärpät during the 2008–09 SM-liiga season.

References

External links
 

1990 births
Living people
Brynäs IF players
Finnish ice hockey defencemen
Lahti Pelicans players
Oulun Kärpät players
Sportspeople from Oulu